Paradystus is a genus of longhorn beetles of the subfamily Lamiinae, containing the following species:

 Paradystus ceylonicus Breuning, 1954
 Paradystus infrarufus Breuning, 1954
 Paradystus innotatus Breuning, 1954
 Paradystus notator (Pascoe, 1867)

References

Saperdini